Constantina Pițigoi (born 25 June 1946) is a former Romanian handball player who competed in the 1976 Summer Olympics.

Pițigoi was part of the Romanian handball team, which finished fourth in the Olympic tournament. She played all five matches and scored two goals.

References

1946 births
Living people
Romanian female handball players 
Olympic handball players of Romania

Handball players at the 1976 Summer Olympics